The Belgium–Korea Treaty of 1901 was negotiated between representatives of the Kingdom of Belgium and the Korean Empire.

Background
In 1876, Korea established a trade treaty with Japan after Japanese ships approached Ganghwado and threatened to fire on the Korean capital city. Treaty negotiations with several Western countries were made possible by the completion of this initial Japanese overture.

In 1882, the Americans concluded a treaty and established diplomatic relations, which served as a template for subsequent negotiations with other Western powers.

Treaty provisions
The Belgians and Koreans negotiated and approved a multi-article treaty with provisions similar to other Western nations.

Ministers from Belgium to Korea were appointed in accordance with this treaty; and they were Leon Vincart, consul general, October 17, 1901, with Maurice Cuvelier as vice consul.

The treaty remained in effect even after the Japanese protectorate was established in 1905.

See also
 Unequal treaties
 List of Ambassadors from Belgium to South Korea

Notes

References
 Kim, Chun-gil. (2005). The History of Korea. Westport, Connecticut: Greenwood Press. ; ;  OCLC 217866287
 Korean Mission to the Conference on the Limitation of Armament, Washington, D.C., 1921-1922. (1922). Korea's Appeal to the Conference on Limitation of Armament. Washington: U.S. Government Printing Office. OCLC 12923609
 Yŏng-ho Ch'oe; William Theodore De Bary; Martina Deuchler and Peter Hacksoo Lee. (2000). Sources of Korean Tradition: From the Sixteenth to the Twentieth Centuries. New York: Columbia University Press. ; ;  OCLC 248562016

Unequal treaties
Treaties of Belgium
Treaties of the Korean Empire
Treaties concluded in 1901
Belgium–South Korea relations
1901 in Belgium
1901 in Korea